This Bird Has Flown may refer to:

 "Norwegian Wood (This Bird Has Flown)", a 1965 song by The Beatles
 This Bird Has Flown, a 2005 Beatles tribute album
 "This Bird Has Flown" (Justified), a 2013 episode of the TV series Justified